Lynne McCarthy is a South African actress, model, journalist and a television presenter. She is best known for her roles in the popular serials Egoli: Place of Gold and Isidingo.

Personal life
She was born on 29 November 1983 in South Africa. She is best known for her starring roles in EGOLI & Isidingo TV soaps. She graduated a D.Phil., doctorate in philosophy & human behavioral psychology from UCLA. Apart from psychology, she has also studied Public Relations and Marketing, Business Management.

Career
After the graduation, she studied acting under Libbe Ferreira and the late Blaise Koch at Sesani Studios in Johannesburg. Then she studied voice coaching and acting with Johan van der Merwe at Katinka Heyns’ Sonneblom Studios in Honeydew. After the course, she trained under W. Morgan Sheppard at the Vincent Chase Workshop in Hollywood.

Her maiden television acting came through the 1991 popular M-Net soapie Egoli: Place of Gold. In the serial, she played the role of 'Zita'. Then in 2008, she played role of 'Elize' in television serial Isidingo. Apart from acting, she is also a journalist and narrator of a documentary Children of Fire. Then she became the co-presenter of the travel show Traveling Africa as well as her own talk radio show Radio Rippel in Pretoria.

As a journalist, she worked as celebrity and A-list events columnist for Citigaming in The Citizen newspaper. The she became a columnist for FHM magazine, under the pseudonym "MissHouston". She is also a model and is represented by Stark Raving Management after part time appearance in the television serial Big Brother.

Filmography

References

External links
 

South African humanitarians
Living people
South African television actresses
South African stage actresses
South African film actresses
1982 births
South African journalists
South African female models